The Nyamata Genocide Memorial is based around a former church  south of Kigali in Rwanda, which commemorates the Rwandan genocide in 1994. The remains of 50,000 people are buried here.

Location
This memorial is one of six national memorial sites in Rwanda that commemorate the Rwanda Genocide. The others are the Murambi Memorial Centre, Bisesero Genocide Memorial Centre, Ntarama Genocide Memorial Centre, Kigali Genocide Memorial, and Nyarubuye Memorial. There are over 250 registered memorial sites that commemorate genocide in Rwanda.

History

The Rwandan genocide began in April 1994. Many Tutsi people gathered here as churches were considered a place of safety. About 10,000 people gathered here and the people locked themselves in. The church walls today show how the perpetrators made holes in the walls of the church so that grenades could be thrown into the church. After this the people inside were shot or killed with machetes. The ceiling of the church shows the bullet holes and the altar cloth is still stained with blood of the people that were murdered. Most of the remains have been buried but clothing and identity cards are left. The identity cards were what identified people as either Tutsi or Hutu.

People in the surrounding area were also killed after the massacre at the church. The remains of 50,000 people are buried here.

See also
Nyamata

References

External links

Nyamata Liberation day, panoramic tour in 2014, The Guardian
Genocide Archive of Rwanda 

Museums in Rwanda
Rwandan genocide
Rwandan genocide museums